Nicely, Nicely is the debut album by the Blake Babies, released in 1987 (see 1987 in music). The band financed the album themselves.

Critical reception
Trouser Press praised the "tunefully presentable songs and the unsettling range of Hatfield’s all-over-the-place singing." The Rough Guide to Rock called the album "shambolic," writing that "it was clearly the sound of a band trying to find their way."

Track listing
All songs written by the Blake Babies.

"Wipe It Up" – 2:57
"Her" – 2:16
"Tom and Bob" – 1:55
"A Sweet Burger LP" (Live) – 2:16
"Bye" (Live) – 3:14
"Let Them Eat Chewy Granola Bars" – 2:07
"Julius Fast Body" – 2:35
"Better 'n You" – 3:58
"Swill and the Cocaine Sluts" – 2:33

Personnel
Juliana Hatfield - vocals and guitar
John Strohm - guitar and vocals
Seth White - bass
Freda Boner (also known as Freda Love) - drums

Production
Producers: T.W. Li and Blake Babies
Engineers: Tracy Chisholm
Mixing: T.W. Li and Tracy Chisholm
Artwork: Juliana Hatfield

References

Blake Babies albums
1987 debut albums